The Delaware Tribe of Indians, formerly known as the Cherokee Delaware or the Eastern Delaware, based in Bartlesville, Oklahoma, is one of three federally recognized tribes of the Lenape people in the United States, the others being with the Delaware Nation based in Anadarko, Oklahoma, and the Stockbridge-Munsee Community of Wisconsin. More Lenape or Delaware people live in Canada.

Government and economic development
The Principal Chief is Brad KillsCrow. The Assistant Chief is Tonya Anna. They are headquartered in Bartlesville and have no tribal jurisdictional area. Their housing program covers Washington, Nowata, Rogers, Craig, and part of Tulsa counties. Their annual tribal economic impact is $2 million.

The Delaware Tribe of Indians is located at 5100 Tuxedo Boulevard in Bartlesville, Oklahoma, 74006.

Enrollment
Tribal membership is limited exclusively to descendants of Delaware people on the 1906 tribal rolls from Indian Territory. Enrollment is based on lineal descent, that is, there are no minimum blood quantum requirements.

Culture
The Council of Lenape Elders works to sustain traditional dances, culture, and the tribal language, and works with the Delaware Gourd Society. The tribe maintains a Delaware Center, on an  parcel of land in Bartlesville. Delaware artists are known for their wood carving and ribbon work skills.

History
The historically Algonquian-speaking Delaware refer to themselves as Lenni Lenape. At first European contact in the early 17th century, the tribe lived along the Delaware River, named for Lord de la Warr, territory in lower present-day New York state and eastern New Jersey, and western Long Island, New York.

The Delaware nation was the first to sign a treaty with the new United States. They signed the treaty on the September 17, 1778. Despite the treaty, the Delaware were forced to cede their Eastern lands and moved first to Ohio and later to Indiana (Plainfield), Missouri, Kansas, and Indian Territory. The ancestors of the Delaware Nation, following a different migration route, settled in Anadarko. Other Delaware bands moved north with the Iroquois after the American Revolutionary War to form two reserves in Ontario, Canada.

Traditionally the Delaware were divided into the Munsee, Unami, and Unalachtigo, three social divisions determined by language and location.

Federal recognition

First recognition
After dealing with the United States on a government-to-government basis, the ancestors of the Delaware Tribe of Indians agreed in 1867 to relocate to the Cherokee Nation in what was then Indian Territory. The Delaware Tribe of Indians operated autonomously within the lands of the Cherokee Nation.

Following passage of the 1972 Appropriations Act, the Bureau of Indian Affairs (BIA) reviewed the 1958 Bylaws of the Delaware Tribe of Indians. It recommended that the tribe adopt membership criteria to comply with the distribution requirements of the Act. In a General Council meeting, the Delaware Tribe amended its bylaws to include such criteria, and the BIA approved the amendments on September 30, 1974. In 1975, the BIA certified that the Delaware Tribe's amended bylaws provided "the legal entity which in the judgment of the Secretary of Interior adequately protects the interest of the Delaware Tribe of Indians pursuant to the [1972 Appropriations Act]." Due to suit filed by the Kansas Delaware, a non-recognized tribe, BIA reviewed all federally recognized Delaware tribes' legal documents. Then in 1979, BIA revoked the Delaware Tribe of Indians' status, stating that the removal to Oklahoma in 1879 with the Cherokees effectively placed the tribe under the authority of the Cherokee Nation. The BIA had determined that the Department of the Interior would generally engage in government-to-government relations with the Delaware Tribe only indirectly through Cherokee Nation, and that the Department would engage in direct relations with the Delaware Tribe solely with respect to the Tribe's claims against the United States.

Second recognition
The Delaware Tribe of Indians regained their federal recognition by the Secretary of the Interior in 1991, when the BIA rescinded its 1979 decision. However, the Cherokee Nation disagreed with the decision and filed suit against the BIA and the Secretary of their decision. The Cherokee Nation's position was upheld in court, leading to the Delaware Tribe's loss of federal recognition in 2004. After years of negotiations, the two tribes resolved their differences through an agreement in October 2008. Delaware voters approved the agreement and voted to reorganize in May 2009, under the authority of the Oklahoma Indian Welfare Act.

Third recognition
On July 28, 2009, The United States Department of the Interior notified the tribal office in Bartlesville that the Delaware are again officially recognized by the U.S. government.

Notable tribal members
Nora Thompson Dean (Touching Leaves Woman, 1907–1984), traditionalist, herbalist, and language instructor
Charles Journeycake (Ne-Sha-Pa-Na-Cumin, December 16, 1817 - January 3, 1894) - In 1861, Journeycake became the principal Chief of the Delaware tribe.
Joanne Barker, professor, author

See also

Lenape
Delaware Nation
Stockbridge-Munsee Community

Notes

External links 
Delaware Tribe of Indians, official website
Eastern Delaware, Oklahoma Historical Society's Encyclopedia of Oklahoma History and Culture

Cherokee Nation (1794–1907)
 
Federally recognized tribes in the United States
Native American tribes in Oklahoma